Pagiri is a 2016 Indian Tamil-language romantic comedy film directed by  Isakki Karvannan and starring newcomer Prabhu Ranaveeran and Shravya.

Cast 
Prabhu Ranaveeran as Murugan
Shravya as Madhu
Ravi Mariya
A. Venkatesh as Madhu's father
T. P. Gajendran 
 K. Rajan as a politician
 G. Marimuthu
 Adhira
Rani as Murugan's mother
Supergood Subramani as Murugan's father
 Saravana Subbiah as a police officer
Vengal Rao
Bava Lakshmanan
Rani as Madhu's mother

Production 
The film is about the effects of WhatsApp and the predicaments of farmers.

Soundtrack 
The songs are composed by Karunas. The audio was released by director Vasanthabalan.

Release 
The film, along with Sadhuram 2, was only released at 6 o'clock pm at Chennai on 16 September due to the Kaveri River water dispute.

Reception 
The Times of India gave the film a rating of two out of five stars and stated that "The film feels like a missed opportunity, especially at a time when farmers are fighting for water". Deccan Chronicle gave the film the same rating and wrote that " In the end, Pagiri is a very novel twist to the 'common man woes' idea, but shallow comedy undermines the impact it could have had".

References

External links 

2016 romantic comedy films
 Indian romantic comedy films